Your Luv is a song released by the South Korean boy band MBLAQ. It is the group's Japanese debut single and was released on May 4, 2011 via Sony Music Records Japan.

Promotions
On May 3, MBLAQ kicked off their Japanese promotions with their debut event held at Kanagawa Plaza, gathering a reported 10,000 fans. They performed the songs "Oh Yeah", "Your Luv" and "Daijoubu" and more than 4,000 CDs were sold during the event. It was announced in June that MBLAQ's "Your Luv" would be used in the Japanese anime adaption of Marvel Comics' "Blade".

Music video
On the 11th of April, the music video for "Your Luv" was released on MTV Japan, and "Your Luv" ringtones were released on the ringtone downloading site, Recochoku. After the release of "Your Luv" on April 19, it was ranked first for 4 consecutive days on Recochoku. MBLAQ were also placed first on the 'Cellphone Message Music Video' chart. Furthermore, pre-orders of MBLAQ's single for the regular and limited A and B editions have ranked first, second and third.

Track listing

Charts
"Your Luv" reached second position on the 'Oricon Daily Charts' for May 3, which is before their official debut and release date. On May 4, their official debut date, "Your Luv" reached first position on the 'Oricon Daily Charts', selling more than 11,000 CDs. A week after debut, MBLAQ reached second position on the 'Oricon Weekly Charts', selling more than 40,000 copies of 'Your Luv'.

Oricon

References

External links
 MBLAQ's Official Site

2011 singles
Dance-pop songs
Japanese-language songs